Charlottesville Alliance FC, formerly Aromas Café FC, is an American amateur soccer club based in Charlottesville, Virginia. In 2016, the club reached the second round of the Lamar Hunt U.S. Open Cup.

Beginning with the 2018 season, Charlottesville Alliance F.C. play in the Northeast Region Mid-Atlantic Conference of the National Premier Soccer League.

Colors and badge

References

External links
 

Soccer clubs in Virginia
Association football clubs established in 2016
 Charlottesville, Virginia